Bridget Bennet born Bridget Howe was an English book collector. She lived at two houses and her husband was a member of Parliament who became Baron Ossulston. Her notes and the changing lists of her books give an insight into her interests, book-lending and self-education.

Life
Bennet's birthplace and date are unknown, but she was the daughter of John Grobham Howe (1625–1679) and Lady Annabella Scroope (d. 1704). Her father came from Langar in Nottinghamshire and her mother was the illegitimate daughter of Emmanuel, first earl of Sunderland. In 1668, she was in Paris and in 1673 she got married. Her new husband Sir John Bennet was a Knight of the Bath he was a Lieutenant of the Honourable Corps of Gentlemen at Arms.

Her new husband had been a member of Parliament for a decade and he had houses in Golden Square in Westminster and Dawley in Harlington, Middlesex. Her husband became Lord Ossulston, Baron Ossulston on 24 November 1682.

On the 4 May 1699 she had over 200 books and three of them were not in English. We know this because she kept records. She had been a widow for four years at this point. Her first known catalogue of her library of books was dated 1680 but it appears to have been kept up to date until 1689. That catalogue was of over 220 books but there was a large variation in the two lists. The 1680 list included 35 books in French including leading women authors Hortense Mancini, Marie-Catherine de Villedieu and Madame de La Fayette. The differences in the collections may be due to sharing books. She lent books to others, including her nephew (and the King's son) Henry FitzRoy, 1st Duke of Grafton, "Mrs Reverwest" and over a dozen books to her son Charles.

The lists show her changing interests particularly an interest in medicine at the time that her daughter died and in the education of women. She owned modern writings including "A dialogue concerning women, being a defence of the sex written to Eugenia" written by William Walsh in 1691, Nahum Tate’s "A Present for the Ladies: being an Historical Vindication of the Female Sex" from the following year and John Dunton’s book "The Challenge sent by a young lady to Sir Thomas &c., or, The Female War" which was published in 1697. These three are all supportive of women at the time and she owned them soon after their publication.

It is unclear when she died, but in 1722 the catalogue created of over 700 books was probably after her death and it was after the death of her son Charles. The books were valued at £115 and one third of the these titles were present in her earlier catalogues. However nearly half of the books that she owned in 1680 did not survive into the 1722 list.

References

Book and manuscript collectors
Ossulston
People from Nottinghamshire (before 1974)
People from Harlington, London
17th-century diarists
17th-century scholars
17th-century English women